The Field hockey at the 1992 Summer Olympics in Barcelona, Spain was held at the Estadi Olímpic de Terrassa in Terrassa from 26 July to 8 August 1992.

Qualification

Men's qualification

Women's qualification

Men's tournament

Preliminary round

Group A

Group B

Medal round

Final standings

Women's tournament

Preliminary round

Group A

Group B

Medal round

Final standings

Medal summary

Medal table

Medalists

References

External links

 
Field hockey at the Summer Olympics
1992 Summer Olympics events
Summer Olympics
1992 Summer Olympics